Dashtestan County is in Bushehr province, Iran. The capital of the county is the city of Borazjan. At the 2006 census, the county's population was 222,226 in 47,773 households. The following census in 2011 counted 229,425 people in 57,562 households. At the 2016 census, the county's population was 252,047 in 70,943 households.

The people of this district revolted against Nader Shah in September 1746. In June 1747 they captured Bushehr.

Administrative divisions

The population history and structural changes of Dashtestan County's administrative divisions over three consecutive censuses are shown in the following table. The latest census shows six districts, 12 rural districts, and nine cities.

References

 

Counties of Bushehr Province